Dean Creek is a river located in Cayuga County, New York, United States.  It flows into Cayuga Lake north of Aurora, New York.

References

Rivers of Cayuga County, New York